This article covers euro gold and silver commemorative coins issued in Germany. It also covers rare cases of collectors coins (coins not planned for normal circulation) minted using other precious metals. It does not cover either the German €2 commemorative coins or the Pre-Euro German Currencies. For euro gold and silver commemorative coins of other countries see Euro gold and silver commemorative coins.

2002 coinage

2003 coinage

2004 coinage

2005 coinage

2006 coinage

2007 coinage

2008 coinage

2009 coinage

2010 coinage

2011 coinage

Notes 

Germany
Coins of Germany